James McLachlan is a Mormon studies scholar and theologian. In 2005 he became the inaugural co-editor, along with Carrie McLachlan, of Element: a Journal of Mormon Philosophy and Theology, the flagship peer-reviewed journal of Mormon theology. McLachlan is also Professor of Philosophy and Religion at Western Carolina University.  , McLachlan co-chaired the American Academy of Religion’s Mormon Studies Group and was a board member of the Society for Mormon Philosophy and Theology.

References

External links
 WorldCat
 "George Holmes Howison: 'The City of God' and Personal Idealism, by James McLachlan, The Journal of Speculative Philosophy 20:3 (2006) (hosted at Muse) 
 "Of Time and Eternity", by James McLachlan, Sunstone (July 2008)

American Latter Day Saint writers
American theologians
Brigham Young University alumni
Indiana University alumni
University of Toronto alumni
Living people
Mormon apologists
Mormon missionaries in France
Mormon missionaries in Switzerland
Mormon studies scholars
Philosophy academics
Western Carolina University faculty
Latter Day Saints from Indiana
Latter Day Saints from North Carolina
Latter Day Saints from Utah
Year of birth missing (living people)
People from Sylva, North Carolina
Mormon theologians